The Hillberg Turbine Exec is an American helicopter turbine engine conversion kit for the piston-engined Rotorway Exec. It was designed and produced by Hillberg Helicopters of Fountain Valley, California. Now out of production, when it was available the kit was supplied for installation by amateur aircraft builders.

Design and development
The kit was designed specifically for the Rotorway Exec, to convert it to turbine power, under the US Experimental - Amateur-built aircraft rules. The resulting aircraft features a single main rotor, a two-seats-in side-by-side configuration enclosed cockpit with a windshield, skid-type landing gear and a  Solar T62 turbo-shaft engine. The T62 was designed as an auxiliary power unit (APU) and used on helicopters such as the Boeing-Vertol CH-47 Chinook and Boeing-Vertol CH-46A Sea Knight. Due to the light weight of the engine used for the conversion kit, the aircraft's empty weight is reduced and the useful load is increased.

The Hillberg Turbine Exec uses airframe components from the Exec and thus the completed aircraft's fuselage is made from aluminum and steel tubing, plus fiberglass for the cockpit fairing.

The Hillberg conversion kit included the T62 engine, reduction gear clutch, tail rotor drive shaft and hangar bearings, main transmission and a new fuel tank.

Operational history
By March 2015 one example had been registered in the United States with the Federal Aviation Administration.

Specifications (Turbine Exec)

See also
 List of rotorcraft

References

Turbine Exec
1990s United States sport aircraft
1990s United States helicopters
Homebuilt aircraft
Single-engined piston helicopters